Agrotis apicalis is a moth of the family Noctuidae first described by Gottlieb August Wilhelm Herrich-Schäffer in 1868. It is found in Florida, the Dominican Republic, Jamaica, Puerto Rico and Cuba.

The wingspan is about 38 mm.

References

Moths described in 1868
Agrotis
Moths of North America